The Mosaic de Font de Mussa (Mosaic from the Source of Mussa, in English) is a Roman mosaic found in Benifaió (Ribera Alta, Land of Valencia) and that dates of the 1st or 2nd century. It is located into the Museum of Prehistory of Valencia, where is one of the most highlighted pieces.

It is a mosaic of opus tessellatum decorated with tesselles of marble of 6 millimeters.

It presents a central decoration polychromated showing figures that represent the shepherd Faustulus and his brother in front of a cave where there is a wolf that would suckle to Romulus and Remus.

References 

Roman mosaics
Valencian culture
Roman Empire art